V394 Aurigae is a semi-regular variable star in the constellation Auriga. Its brightness varies between magnitudes 6.01 and 6.11, so it is faintly visible to the naked eye under ideal observing conditions. Koen and Eyer found that the star's brightness, as seen by Hipparcos, varies with a period of 3.9 days. Located around 730 light-years distant, V394 Aurigae shines with a luminosity approximately 1075 times that of the Sun and has a surface temperature of 3589 K.

It is a double star: the secondary, designated V394 Aurigae B, is an eleventh-magnitude star with a separation of 10 arcseconds.

References

Auriga (constellation)
041429
Semiregular variable stars
Double stars
028930
M-type bright giants
Aurigae, V394
2146
F-type main-sequence stars
Durchmusterung objects